is a Shinto shrine located at Sakyō-ku, Kyoto, Kyoto Prefecture Japan.

History
The shrine became the object of Imperial patronage during the early Heian period. In 965, Emperor Murakami ordered that Imperial messengers were sent to report important events to the guardian kami of Japan. These heihaku were initially presented to 16 shrines including the Kifune Shrine.

The shrine is also associated with the Ushi no toki mairi, the ritual of wearing candles on one's head and laying a curse at a shrine during the "hour of the Ox", since it is from the resident deity that Hashihime (Princess of the Uji Bridge) learns the prescribed ritual to turn herself into an oni demon to exact vengeance, the story of which is immortalized in the Noh play Kanawa ("The Iron Crown").

See also 
 List of Shinto shrines
 Twenty-Two Shrines
 Modern system of ranked Shinto Shrines

Notes

References
 Breen, John and Mark Teeuwen. (2000).  Shinto in History: Ways of the Kami. Honolulu: University of Hawaii Press. 
 Ponsonby-Fane, Richard. (1962).   Studies in Shinto and Shrines. Kyoto: Ponsonby Memorial Society. OCLC 399449
 . (1959).  The Imperial House of Japan. Kyoto: Ponsonby Memorial Society. OCLC 194887

External links
 Official Site
 

Beppyo shrines

Shinto shrines in Kyoto